Micropterix montosiella is a species of moth belonging to the family Micropterigidae. It was described by Zagulajev in 1983.

References

Micropterigidae
Moths described in 1983
Taxa named by Aleksei Konstantinovich Zagulyaev